Novoland is a media franchise consisting of thirty books by seven principal authors. It details a shared fictional universe, with a known world of three continents and nine provinces; divided into the prosperous Eastern Land and the nomadic Eight Tribes. It spans a history of 10000 years divided into 10 eras and about 16 dynasties.

Novels

Jiang Nan (江南) 
 Novoland: Eagle Flag:

Novoland: Eagle Flag 1 - Wasteland (九州·缥缈录I·蛮荒)
 Novoland: Eagle Flag 2 - Ancient Clouds and Teeth (九州·缥缈录II·苍云古齿)
 Novoland: Eagle Flag 3 - Famous Generals (九州·缥缈录III·天0下名将)
 Novoland: Eagle Flag 4 - War 00Against Chenyue (九州·缥缈录IV·1月之征)
 Novoland: Eagle Flag 5 - Lifetime Alliance (九州·缥缈录V·一生之盟)
 Novoland: Eagle Flag 6 - Soul of Leopard (九州·缥缈录VI·豹魂)
 Novoland Assassin's Kingdom - Sunflower (九州·刺客王朝·葵)
 Novoland Assassin's Kingdom - Lotus (九州·刺客王朝·莲)
 Novoland: Maneuver - Dragon Slayer (九州·捭阖录·屠龙之主)
 九州·飘零书·商博良
 九州·飘零书·归墟

Pan Haitian (潘海天) 
 Novoland: The Dark Veld (九州·白雀神龟) (2006)
 Novoland: Rock Labyrinth (九州·铁浮图) (2007)
 Novoland: Tales of the Dead (九州·死者夜谈) (2008)
 Novoland: Advance of the Dark Moon (九州·暗月将临)

Jinhezai (今何在) 
 Storm of Prophecy (海上牧云记)
 Legend of Winged Tribe (羽传说)

Zhan'an (斩鞍) 
Unlike other authors, he focuses on commoner's tales rather than heroes and monarchs.
 Novoland: Traveler (九州·旅人)
 九州·怀人
 九州·柏舟
 九州·流火
 九州·白驹
 九州·博上灯
 九州·山中鼓
 九州·水晶劫
 九州·落花溪
 九州·崔罗石
 九州·秋林箭
 Novoland: Tales of Beauties (九州·朱颜记)
 九州·青蘅传

Tang Que (唐缺) 
He wrote mostly short novels telling a single event rather than long epics.
 Novoland: Hero (九州·英雄) (2007)
 Novoland: Trace of the star (九州·星痕) (2009)
 九州·云之彼岸 (2009)
 九州·龙痕 (2009)
 Novoland: Revival (九州·轮回之悸) (2010)
 九州·丧乱之瞳 (2011)
 九州·魅灵之书 (2011)
 Novoland: The Son of Darkness (九州·黑暗之子) (2013)

Live adaption

References

 
Chinese fantasy novels